Night Life Hero (released in the Philippines as I Love You Baby) is a 1992 Hong Kong action comedy film written and directed by Yuen Jun-man. This film stars Max Mok, Fennie Yuen and Chin Ka-lok.

Cast
Max Mok as Chung
Fennie Yuen as Baby
Chin Kar-lok as Peter
Shing Fui-On as Chiu
Perrie Lai as Pretty
Bowie Wu as James Lee
Sam Wong as Smartie
Ridley Tsui as Wah
Wong Kar-leung as Thug and servant
Benny Lai as Kuen
Stuart Ong as Baby's fiance
Stephen Tung as Red car owner (cameo)
Chan Chi-fai as Thug
James Ha as Thug
Simon Lung as Restaurant customer
Chun Hung as Restaurant customer
Michael
Fei Ming
Simon Cheung as Policeman
William Leung as Thug
Cheung Siu as Street restaurant owner
Hui Sze-man as Mrs Chan
Choi Hin-cheung as Thug
Chan King-chi as Thug
Ching Wai-chung as Thug
Wong Kim-wai as Thug
Ching Kwok-leung as Thug
Sep Lap-fai
Bald Barry

Release
Night Life Hero was released in Hong Kong on 12 November 1992. In the Philippines, the film was released as I Love You Baby by Harvest Films on 11 February 1993.

Box office
This film grossed HK$1,970,273 during its theatrical run in Hong Kong.

References

External links

1992 films
1992 action comedy films
1992 martial arts films
1990s Cantonese-language films
Films set in Hong Kong
Films shot in Hong Kong
Hong Kong action comedy films
Hong Kong martial arts films
Martial arts comedy films
1990s Hong Kong films